Open All Night is an American sitcom that aired on ABC from November 28, 1981, to March 5, 1982. The show centered on Gordon Feester (George Dzundza) and his oddball family working in an all-night chain grocery store named 364 Store that is open everyday except Christmas. Store manager Feester lives in an apartment above the store with his wife, Gretchen, and his teenaged step-son, Terry.

Robin is the tall night manager, and officers Steve and Edie often stop by for coffee and doughnuts, but are never able to catch shoplifters or other criminals.

Despite a similar title and a setting, it has no connection to the British series Open All Hours. Jay Tarses was co-creator, writer, co-star and occasional director of the show.

Cassandra Peterson (better known for her Elvira persona) made a guest appearance on one episode. David Letterman also made a guest appearance, and made a sly reference to his daytime talk show, which was canceled a year before.

Cast

Main
 George Dzundza as Gordon Feester
 Susan Tyrrell as Gretchen Feester
 Sam Whipple as Terry Hoffmeister
 Bubba Smith as Robin, the night manager
 Jay Tarses as Officer Steve
 Bever-Leigh Banfield as Officer Edie

Recurring
 Clyde Phillip Taylor as Dr. Cavanaugh, an eccentric regular customer
 Joe Mantegna appeared occasionally as an unnamed regular customer who only ever seemed to ask for change

References

External links

Open All Night summary on TV.com

1981 American television series debuts
1982 American television series endings
American Broadcasting Company original programming
1980s American sitcoms
Television shows set in Cleveland